The Vidyavardhini's College of Engineering and Technology(VCET), is an engineering college in Vasai-Virar. The college is affiliated to University of Mumbai and offers Bachelor's degree in Engineering.
The college has been graded 'A' by the DTE. The five branches Computer Engineering, Electronics & Telecommunication Engineering, Information Technology Engineering, Instrumentation Engineering, and Mechanical Engineering have been accredited by National Board of Accreditation(NBA) for the period of 3 years w.e.f. April 2012.college has introduced two new branches Artificial intelligence and data science & computer science and Engineering (Data Science)

Vidyavardhini’s College of Engineering and Technology, Vasai is located on the sprawling campus of Vidyavardhini, spread over an area of 12.27 acres. It is a short, two minutes walk from Vasai Road Railway Station.

Among the college's alumni are Mr. Rohit K Patil, entrepreneur and creator of online shopping portal Ekdontin.com, and Mr Victor Sinha, head of international sales and marketing at Indore Composites.

Courses

Under-Graduate Degrees Offered
Each department listed below offers courses in their respective disciplines towards a BE degree.

 B. E. (Civil Engineering)
 B. E. (Computer Engineering)
 B. E. (Electronics And Telecommunication Engineering)
 B. E. (Information Technology)
 B. E. (Instrumentation Engineering)
 B. E. (Mechanical Engineering)# Regular shift
 B. E. (Mechanical Engineering)# Second shift
 B. E. ( Artificial intelligence and data science)
 B. E. (Computer science and Engineering-Data science)

Annual Extracurricular Events
Internship Fair: Provides Internship
E-Summit: Entrepreneurship Summit
Bizmaster: Business plan competition 
SHABD:    Annual Literary Festival
ZEAL:     Cultural Festival
OCTAVES:     Rock/Metal Music Festival
ORION:    Technical festival
VISTA:    Annual College Magazine
OPUS:     National Level Project Competition
ANVESHAN: National Level Project Competition
Sports:   Badminton, Volleyball, Box Cricket, Football, ThrowBall, Table Tennis, Carrom
SANRACHNA: Technical Festival

Student Bodies
The college has an Entrepreneurship Cell headed by Ecell Chairperson selected through a process of interviews.

The Students' Council headed by the General Secretary manages the Cultural activities and the Magazine Committee headed by the Magazine Secretary manages all the Literary Activities.

Moreover, each stream has its own student bodies - 
 Indian Society of Heating, Refrigerating and Air Conditioning Engineers (ISHRAE)
Civil Engineering Student Association (C.E.S.A.)
Computer Society Of India (CSI)
The Institute of Electrical and Electronics Engineers (IEEE)
Institution of Electronics and Telecommunication Engineering (IETE)
V.C.E.T's Mechanical Engineers Association (VMEA)
International Society of Automation (ISA)
 Society of Automobile Engineers (SAE)

Under the SAE chapter of the college, a team of 22 students participated in SUPRA 2014, a prestigious F1 car design and manufacturing competition which is annually held by SAE INDIA.
2014 was Ethan Racing's very first entry to Supra.

See also
University of Mumbai
List of Mumbai Colleges

References

   2) https://www.facebook.com/TeamEthanRacing

External links
Official site

Affiliates of the University of Mumbai
Engineering colleges in Mumbai
Education in Vasai-Virar